TV3 is a commercial television channel targeted at an Estonian language audience owned by Providence Equity Partners.

History
It was founded in 1996 after two recently established television stations, EVTV and RTV, were merged.

TV3 has two sister channels. TV6 is a television channel targeted at entertainment television channel in Estonia, launched in 2002. TV8 is an entertainment television channel, launched as a digital sister channel to TV3 in 2009.

For several years, TV3 had better ratings than the other private channel, Kanal 2. The situation changed in 2006, when Kanal 2 made some big changes in their programme.  TV3 ratings fell and shows had problems getting enough viewers to reach the Top 10 of the week. Later that year, programme director Jüri Pihel left TV3.

In 2009 all Baltic TV3 channels introduced new red-white visual identity, logo and slogan. The slogan was "Tere tulemast koju!" (Welcome home!). News programme "Seitsmesed uudised" (News at 7) was discontinued and changed with a new "TV3 uudised" (TV3 News), which had the same format as Latvian and Lithuanian TV3 News programmes.

In January 2011 Mikko Silvennoinen, a Finnish television host, journalist and producer, was hired as the new programme director. In February TV3 changed their news programme format and "Seitsmesed uudised" was brought back. On 15 August, TV3 once again changed their visual identity and logo from red to purple, which was so far used in Norwegian, Danish, Hungarian and Slovenian TV3s. Also a new slogan was introduced: "Rohkem elu, rohkem meelelahutust!" (More life, more entertainment!).

TV3, as with other channels of the All Media Baltics group in the Baltic states, switched to HD broadcasting on 26 July 2018.

Currently airing (as of June 2014)

Estonian shows and series

Foreign shows and series

Logos

See also
List of Estonian television channels
TV3 (Viasat)

References

External links

 Online archive of TV3 shows

Television channels in Estonia
TV3 Estonia
Television channels and stations established in 1996
1996 establishments in Estonia
Mass media in Tallinn
Television channel articles with incorrect naming style